Launch Rock is a submerged rock lying southwest of the Glover Rocks, off the south end of Adelaide Island, Antarctica. It was named by the UK Antarctic Place-Names Committee to commemorate the unnamed launch from RRS John Biscoe that was used by the Hydrographic Survey Unit which charted this area in 1963.

References

Rock formations of Adelaide Island